Several ships have been named Nassau. 

  was launched at New Providence in 1784. From 1785 to 1792 she sailed from London to New Providence, Philadelphia, Jamaica, Smyrna, and Quebec. A new owner in 1792 moved her registration and homeport to Bristol to sail her as a slave ship in the triangular trade in enslaved people. She made one complete slave trading voyage. A French squadron captured and burnt her in 1794 as she was on her way to Africa on her second such voyage.
  was launched at Gosport in 1819. In 1824 a pirate plundered her, and then let her proceed. She was wrecked in August 1825 as she was on her way back to London from a voyage to New South Wales.

See also
  – one of six vessels of the Royal Navy
  – Patrol boat of the Bahamian navy

Ship names